Paul is a 2011 comic science fiction road film directed by Greg Mottola from a screenplay by Simon Pegg and Nick Frost. Starring Pegg and Frost, with the voice and motion capture of Seth Rogen as the titular character, the film follows two science fiction geeks who come across an alien. Together, they help the alien escape from the Secret Service agents who are pursuing him so that he can return to his home world. The film is a parody of other science-fiction films, especially those of Steven Spielberg, as well as of science fiction fandom in general.

It is a British-American venture produced by Working Title Films, StudioCanal, Big Talk Pictures and Relativity Media and distributed by Universal Pictures. Paul was released on 14 February 2011 in the United Kingdom and on 18 March 2011 in the United States to generally positive reviews from critics and grossed $98 million worldwide on a $40 million budget.

Plot
Best friends Graeme Willy and Clive Gollings are British comic book and sci-fi enthusiasts who travel to the United States to attend the annual San Diego Comic-Con. They embark on a road trip through the Southwestern U.S. to visit UFO sites on a remote desert highway at night. 

After a brush with homophobic rednecks at a diner, they watch a car driving erratically and crashing. Stopping to offer assistance to the driver, he is revealed to be Paul, an alien. Graeme agrees to give him a ride, despite Clive fainting and wetting his pants upon seeing him.

Later, Special Agent Zoil of the Secret Service arrives at the car-crash site, informing his unseen female superior, "the Big Guy", that he is closing in on Paul. She sends rookies Haggard and O'Reilly to assist. Clive remains paranoid over Paul's intentions, considering his appearance as evidence of a conspiracy. Then Paul explains the government fed his image to the public to keep them from panicking if anyone encounters his race.  

They later camp at an RV park run by Christian fundamentalists, one-eyed Ruth Buggs and her father Moses. The next day, when Ruth sees Paul, she faints, so they take her with them. During an argument, Paul convinces Ruth to question her beliefs and uses his healing power to cure her blind eye.

Stopping at a bar, Ruth calls her father, but Zoil intercepts the call. She is accosted by the rednecks and a bar fight ensues. They escape when Paul terrifies them into fainting. Later, at another RV park, Ruth is questioned by Agent Zoil, but plays dumb and escapes. Meanwhile, Haggard and O'Reilly have figured out about Paul. Confronting Zoil, he orders them to return to base, but they go behind his back and try to catch the alien on their own.

The group soon arrives at Tara's, who rescued Paul when he crashed on Earth 60 years ago, accidentally killing her dog (hence Paul's name) in the crash (opening scene). As no-one believed her story, she has spent her life as a pariah. Although angry at first, she forgives Paul and prepares to make tea for her visitors. Haggard, O'Reilly and Zoil arrive and surround the house. The group flee but O'Reilly shoots at them, igniting gas from Tara's stove and destroying her house with him inside. Haggard pursues and catches up to the RV but loses control and drives off a cliff. Zoil reassures the Big Guy that he will have Paul within the hour but tired of waiting, she orders a "military response".

Paul, Graeme, Clive, Ruth and Tara arrive at Devils Tower National Monument, where they set off fireworks to signal Paul's mothership. A helicopter suddenly arrives with agents and the Big Guy. Zoil appears and initiates a stand-off, unexpectedly shooting the agents, before being wounded. He is revealed to be Paul's friend, attempting to aid his escape under the guise of capturing him. During the fight, Tara knocks out the Big Guy. Moses arrives unexpectedly and fires at Paul, but hits Graeme instead. Paul once again uses his healing powers, reviving Graeme in spite of the danger to himself, causing Moses to believe Paul to be a messiah.

Graeme and Ruth admit their feelings for each other and kiss, but the Big Guy regains consciousness and holds the group at gunpoint. Just as she is about to kill them, she is crushed by the landing transport ship. Paul says goodbye to his friends and offers Tara a chance to go with him, promising to give her a new life after ruining her childhood and accidentally killing her dog. The aliens go home as the remaining humans wave. Two years later, Graeme, Clive and Ruth are at another Comic-Con, where Graeme and Clive are promoting their new bestselling novel titled Paul.

Cast

 Simon Pegg as Graeme Willy
 Nick Frost as Clive Gollings
 Seth Rogen as Paul (voice and motion capture)
 Jason Bateman as Special Agent Lorenzo Zoil. Describing his character as an "exaggerated nasty guy", Bateman based his portrayal of Zoil on Yaphet Kotto in Midnight Run and Tommy Lee Jones in The Fugitive. His name is a play-on of the film, Lorenzo's Oil (1992).
 Kristen Wiig as Ruth Buggs
 Bill Hader as Agent Haggard
 Blythe Danner as Tara Walton
 Mia Stallard as Young Tara Walton
 Joe Lo Truglio as Agent O'Reilly
 John Carroll Lynch as Moses Buggs, Ruth's father
 Jane Lynch as Pat Stevens
 David Koechner as Gus, a redneck whom Graeme and Clive first encounter in a Nevada gas station.
 Jesse Plemons as Jake, Gus's friend.
 Sigourney Weaver as "The Big Guy". In an interview with Graham Norton, Weaver stated: "It's a love letter to sci-fi fans. I jumped at the chance to be in it. To find a comedy that also pays homage to sci-fi is a dream come true."
 Syd Masters as himself, singing cowboy on stage
 Jeffrey Tambor as Adam Shadowchild, a famous science fiction writer
 Steven Spielberg as Himself (voice)

In an interview for the DVD release of Paul, Pegg and Frost said they made the film to demonstrate their love for Steven Spielberg's films Close Encounters of the Third Kind and E.T. the Extra Terrestrial, as well as their favourite science-fiction films. After they mentioned the project to Spielberg, he suggested he might make a cameo appearance, and a scene was added to include him as a voice on a speakerphone in 1980 discussing ideas with Paul for his soon-to-become box office hit E.T. the Extra-Terrestrial. According to Robert Kirkman, he, along with Invincible co-creator Cory Walker and Invincible artist Ryan Ottley, had a cameo in the film as the Big Guy's henchmen.

Production

The idea for Paul came from Pegg and Frost in 2003, while they were filming Shaun of the Dead. To help with the script, Pegg and Frost went on their own road trip across America and used ideas from it to add to the script. According to Mottola, the film was given the green light shortly before the late 2000s recession; if it had been delayed, "they probably wouldn’t have made the movie." The budget for the film was around US$40 million. Principal photography, including 50 days in the New Mexico desert, wrapped on 9 September 2009, with additional scenes filmed in July 2010 at the Albuquerque Convention Center, which was designed to look like the 2010 San Diego Comic-Con. During filming, Joe Lo Truglio was a stand-in for the character Paul, the only character who was created by CGI, although Seth Rogen, the voice of Paul did some motion capture in preproduction during postproduction. The cover art for the fictional comic book Encounter Briefs was drawn by alternative comics artist Daniel Clowes.

Release

A teaser trailer for the film was released on 18 October 2010. The film had its world premiere in London on 7 February 2011.

Home media
The film was released on DVD and Blu-ray in the United Kingdom on 13 June 2011 and was released in North America on 9 August 2011. Three versions of the film were made. The DVD release features an audio commentary with director Greg Mottola, stars Simon Pegg, Nick Frost, Bill Hader, and producer Nira Park; two featurettes; "Simon's Silly Faces"; photo galleries; storyboards and posters; and a blooper reel. The United States Blu-ray release features all the DVD supplements with nine more featurettes and a digital copy.

Reception

Box office
Paul grossed $37.4 million in the United States and Canada, and $63.6 million in other territories, for a worldwide total of $98 million.

In North America, Paul opened on March 18, 2011 alongside Limitless and The Lincoln Lawyer. It went on to debut to $13 million, finishing fifth at the box office.

Critical response
On review aggregator Rotten Tomatoes, the film holds an approval rating of 70% based on 207 reviews, with an average rating of 6.30/10. The website's critical consensus reads, "It doesn't measure up to Pegg and Frost's best work, but Paul is an amiably entertaining — albeit uneven — road trip comedy with an intergalactic twist." On Metacritic, the film received a score of 57 based on 37 reviews, indicating "mixed or average reviews". Audiences polled by CinemaScore gave the film an average grade of "B+" on an A+ to F scale.

Empire rated the film "excellent" (four stars out of five), stating, "Broader and more accessible than either Shaun of the Dead or Hot Fuzz, Paul is pure Pegg and Frost — clever, cheeky, and very, very funny. You'll never look at E.T. in the same way again." SFX also gives the film four stars out of five, saying, "the film veers dangerously close to alienating (no pun intended) all but its geek core audience, [though] the more obvious concessions to a mainstream crowd [are] never enough to derail the film's laugh-a-minute ride"; SFX also calls it a "triumph of visual effects, convincing characterisation and bad taste humour." Peter Bradshaw gave the film two stars out of five and called it a "goofy, amiable piece of silliness" exhibiting "self-indulgence" and possessing a "distinct shortage of real gags". On the same scale Nigel Andrews gave the film only one star, calling it a "faltering extraterrestrial knockabout". The Independent grades the film two stars out of five, saying, "Pegg is likeable as usual, Frost more doltish than usual, and Kristen Wiig an appealing convert from Bible thumper to ladette", and notes that "from time to time, clever ideas rear their heads – like the idea that 'Paul' has been the brains behind all science-fiction and UFO initiatives for the last 30 years, including Close Encounters and The X-Files – but they soon return to the film's default setting of laddish japes and a conviction that the word 'cocksucker' will always get a laugh."

IGN provided Paul with three reviews. The first gave the film three stars, stating, "Simon Pegg and Nick Frost send up everything from Star Wars to E.T. in this sci-fi comedy ... As with Pegg and Frost's previous films together, it's derivative stuff, the plot similar to countless sci-fi flicks of the past; paying homage to the good and gently ribbing the bad." Less excited was their review for the British Blu-ray version, which said, "But unlike previous Pegg and Frost collaborations – Shaun of the Dead and Hot Fuzz – Paul does not generously reward repeat viewing. That's not to say it's a bad film at all; it has a strong central premise, which carries much of the film, loveable central characters, the odd neat idea (it turns out that Paul inspired all major works of SF post-1950, from Close Encounters to The X-Files, and has a direct line to Steven Spielberg), and a couple of genuine laughs, but it never feels more than a rough sketch of a bigger, much funnier movie." In a second review for the American Blu-ray version, IGN compared the movie with Galaxy Quest and wrote that it is "richly layered with clever homage, a refreshingly original alien hero, delightfully entertaining characters and great performances from our leads and their supporting players."

Upon its release in the United States, Roger Ebert gave Paul a mixed review of two and a half stars out of four, saying it is a "movie that teeters on the edge of being really pretty good and loses its way. I'm not sure quite what goes wrong, but you can see that it might have gone right."  Manohla Dargis of The New York Times wrote: "As genial, foolish and demographically engineered as it sounds (hailing all fan boys and girls), Paul is at once a buddy flick and a classic American road movie of self (and other) discovery, interspersed with buckets of expletives and some startling (especially for a big-studio release) pokes at Christian fundamentalism ... The movie has its attractions, notably Mr. Pegg and Mr. Frost (and of course Mr. Bateman), whose ductile, (noncomputer) animated and open faces were made for comedy ... Paul proves the weak link. One problem is that Mr. Rogen, however comically inclined, has become overexposed, and there’s just something too familiar and predictable about this voice coming out of that body. Yet while Paul seems great conceptually, he's not particularly interesting or surprising, despite a funny recap of what he’s been doing on his time on Earth. With his vibe and vocabulary, shorts and weed, juvenilia and sentimentality, Paul turns out to be not much different from a lot of guys who have wreaked comedy havoc on American screens lately, even if this one only wants to beam up, not knock up."

Accolades

Soundtrack
Paul: Music from the Original Motion Picture was released on 21 February 2011 by Universal Music. It intersperses David Arnold's score with the rock songs appearing in the film.

Future
Pegg has stated that he would like to do a sequel to Paul, titled Pauls, but that the time and expense it would take means it is unlikely to happen unless costs decrease. On August 13, 2021 during a live stream on Instagram, Pegg stated that there was 'no chance' of a sequel.

See also
 List of British films of 2011
 List of American films of 2011
 List of media set in San Diego

References

External links

 
 

2011 films
2010s buddy comedy films
2010s science fiction comedy films
2010s English-language films
2010s American films
2010s parody films
2010s road movies
British buddy films
British science fiction comedy films
British parody films
British road movies
British science fiction adventure films
American adventure comedy films
American buddy comedy films
American science fiction comedy films
American science fiction adventure films
American parody films
American road movies
Films about extraterrestrial life
Films directed by Greg Mottola
Films produced by Tim Bevan
Films produced by Eric Fellner
Films scored by David Arnold
Films with screenplays by Simon Pegg
Films set in 1947
Films set in 2011
Films set in Nevada
Films shot in New Mexico
Films with atheism-related themes
Films using motion capture
Relativity Media films
Big Talk Productions films
Universal Pictures films
Working Title Films films
StudioCanal films
2011 comedy films
Films set in San Diego
Films shot in San Diego
Films critical of religion
2010s British films